The France men's national water polo team is the representative for France in international men's water polo.

Results

Olympic Games

1900 –  Bronze medal *2
1912 – 6th place
1920 – 9th place
1924 –  Gold medal
1928 –  Bronze medal
1936 – 4th place
1948 – 6th place
1960 – Second round
1988 – 10th place
1992 – 11th place
2016 – 11th place
2024 – Qualified

World Championship

1982 – 13th place
1986 – 8th place
1991 – 12th place
2017 – 14th place

FINA World League
 2006 – 6th place
 2020 – 7th place
 2022 – 4th place

European Championship

1927 –  Silver medal
1931 – 6th place
1934 – 6th place
1938 – 6th place
1947 – 7th place
1950 – 6th place
1954 – 9th place
1958 – 8th place
1966 – 13th place
1970 – 11th place
1989 – 12th place
1991 – 11th place
2001 – 12th place
2014 – 10th place
2016 – 9th place
2018 – 12th place
2020 – 13th place
2022 – 6th place

Team

Current squad
Roster for the 2020 Men's European Water Polo Championship.

Head coach: Nenad Vukanić

Notable players
Michaël Bodegas (later Italy)
Ugo Crousillat (intermission Montenegro)

See also
 France men's Olympic water polo team records and statistics
 List of Olympic champions in men's water polo
 List of men's Olympic water polo tournament records and statistics

References

External links

Men's national water polo teams
 
Men's sport in France